Electronic Cottage was a printed magazine that championed and examined DIY cassette culture phenomenon, including reviewers of sound collage, noise music, electronic music and other forms of experimental music. There were six issue produced between the years 1989 to 1991. The first issue was published in April 1989. Hal McGee was the magazine's editor and publisher. The magazine was based in Apollo Beach, Florida. It has since been revived as an online community, emphasizing experimental music and its creators.

Policy on community 
Electronic Cottage was the only magazine devoted entirely to the home-taper scene. It emphasized its community communication aspect, with mailing addresses included in the magazine, as well as ample information to introduce its readers to new sound artists with the goal of facilitating further creative interaction between home tapers.

Cassette compilations 
Three cassette compilations were produced by Hal McGee in association with his Electronic Cottage magazine. They included quirky spoken-word pieces, dark noise music, incidental music, ambient music, sound collage, psychedelia, synthesizer music, folksy, pop, and weird rock music. The online version continues to produce compilations occasionally.

Contributing writers 
Hal McGee
Andrew Orford
Al Margolis (If, Bwana)
Chris Phinney
Dave Prescott
Bill Waid
Dreamgirl Stephanie Ashlyn 
Carl Howard
John Hudak
Allan Conroy
John Collegio
Jeph Jerman
Roger Moneymaker
Robin James
Bret Hart

References 
 Gwen Allen, Artists' Magazines: An Alternative Space for Art, The MIT Press
 Thomas Bey William Bailey, Unofficial Release: Self-Released And Handmade Audio In Post-Industrial Society, Belsona Books Ltd.
 Jon Pareles on cassette underground, The New York Times, May 11, 1987
 Robin James ed. Cassette Mythos, Autonomedia, 1992
 Neil Strauss “Putting the Net Over Networking", in Cassette Mythos, Autonomedia, pp. 130–132
 Hal McGee, “Early Experiences”, 2011 online article 
 Hal McGee's manifesto in Electronic Cottage issue 1 number 1, pp. 5–7

Footnotes

External links 
Download all of Electronic Cottage No. 1 
Download all of Electronic Cottage No. 2 
Electronic Cottage Compilation Volume 1 (1990) 
Hal McGee, “Early Experiences”, 2011 online article 

Music magazines published in the United States
Defunct magazines published in the United States
Fanzines
Magazines established in 1989
Magazines disestablished in 1991
Magazines published in Florida
1989 establishments in Florida
1991 disestablishments in Florida
Cassette culture 1970s–1990s